Stadio Erasmo Iacovone is a multi-use stadium in Taranto, Italy. It is currently used mostly for football matches and is the home ground of Taranto Sport. The stadium holds 27,584 people.

The stadium was founded in 1965 as the Stadio Salinella and was renamed after , an Italian footballer who died in a car accident at the age of 25 while he was in Taranto, in 1978.

References 

Erasmo Iacovone
Taranto
Sports venues in Apulia
1965 establishments in Italy
Sports venues completed in 1965